The 2022 Scottish local elections were held on 5 May 2022, as part of the 2022 United Kingdom local elections. All 1,227 seats across all 32 Scottish local authorities were up for election and voter turnout was 44.8%.

Compared to the previous elections of 2017, the Scottish National Party (SNP) gained seats and maintained its position as largest party in local government, winning 36.9% of the seats available. Scottish Labour (winning 22.9% of seats) gained seats, whilst the Scottish Conservatives (who won 17.5%) lost many seats, being displaced by Scottish Labour as the second-largest party. Independent candidates also lost seats, whilst the Scottish Liberal Democrats and the Scottish Greens increased their vote share and gained seats across Scotland.

At the 2017 election, no council was won by an overall majority of any party. In the 2022 election, the SNP increased its vote share and secured an overall majority on Dundee City Council, whilst Labour won overall control of West Dunbartonshire Council. Scottish Conservative leader Douglas Ross blamed his party's bad results on the partygate scandal.

The Alba Party and Scottish Family Party ran candidates in around 100 seats each but failed to win any. The Rubbish Party and West Dunbartonshire Community Party held their singular seats, whilst the British Unionist Party gained their first seat from the Conservatives.

Background 

The last election was in 2017, which was held five years after the 2012 election, instead of four was changed in order to avoid clashing with the 2016 Scottish Parliament election.

Boundaries Scotland have conducted a review of electoral arrangements for six councils under the terms of the Islands (Scotland) Act 2018. The Scottish Parliament's Local Government Committee accepted the new boundaries in Na h-Eileanan an Iar, North Ayrshire, Orkney and Shetland, but recommended against approval of the changes in Argyll and Bute and Highland.

Voting system and eligibility to vote 

Councillors are elected to represent multi-member wards using the Single Transferable Vote (STV) method, which has been used for all elections to local authorities in Scotland since the 2007 election. Previous to this election, in all votes since 2007, wards have been sized such that either 3 or 4 councillors are elected per ward. However, this election was different. The Islands (Scotland) Act 2018 and the Scottish Elections (Reform) Act 2020 have given Boundaries Scotland increased flexibility to vary the size of wards. Mainland wards may now have between 2 and 5 councillors, and single councillor wards are permitted where such a ward includes an inhabited island. For these elections wards represented by one, two or five councillors will only be contested in the four council areas in which ward boundaries have been redrawn after 2017, namely Na h-Eileanan an Iar, North Ayrshire, Orkney and Shetland.

Overall, the 32 local authorities had one one-seat district (Arran), seven two-seat districts and three five-seat districts (North Ayrshire) in addition to the bulk of the members elected in three and four seat districts.

All registered electors (British citizens and all other foreign nationals with leave to remain, including refugees) who are aged 16 or over on polling day are entitled to vote in the local elections. A person who has two homes (such as a university student who has a term-time address and lives at home during holidays) can register to vote at both addresses as long as they are not in the same electoral area, and can vote in the local elections for the two different local councils.

Individuals must have been registered to vote by midnight on 18 April 2022. The deadlines to register for a postal vote and proxy vote were 19 and 26 April 2022, respectively.

Results

|- style="background-color:#E9E9E9;
! scope="col" colspan="2" rowspan=2 | Party
! scope="col" colspan="3" | First-preference votes
! scope="col" colspan="2" | Councils
! scope="col" colspan="2" | 2017 seats
! scope="col" colspan="3" | 2022 seats
|-
! scope="col" | Count
! scope="col" | Of total (%)
! scope="col" | Change
! scope="col" | Count
! scope="col" | Change
! scope="col" | Count
! scope="col" | Of total (%)
! scope="col" | Count
! scope="col" | Of total (%)
! scope="col" | Change
|-
| style="background-color:"|
| style="text-align:left;" |No overall control
| colspan=3 
| 27
|style="background-color:#ffe8e8;"| 2
| colspan=2 
| colspan=3 
|-
| style="background-color:"|
| style="text-align:left;" |SNP
|633,252
|34.1%
| 1.8%
|1
|style="background-color:#dfd;"| 1
|431
|35.1%
|453
|37.0%
|style="background-color:#dfd;"| 22
|-
| style="background-color:"|
| style="text-align:left;" |Labour
|403,243
|21.7%
| 1.6%
|1
|style="background-color:#dfd;"| 1
|262
|21.4%
|282
|23.1%
|style="background-color:#dfd;"| 20
|-
|-
| style="background-color:"|
| style="text-align:left;" |Conservative
|364,824
|19.6%
| 5.7%
|0
| 
|276
|22.5%
|214
|17.5%
|style="background-color:#ffe8e8"| 63
|-
| style="background-color:"|
| style="text-align:left;" |Liberal Democrats
|159,815
|8.6%
| 1.7%
|0
| 
|67
|5.5%
|87
|7.1%
|style="background-color:#dfd;"| 20
|-
| style="background-color:"|
| style="text-align:left;" |Independents
|156,815
|8.4%
| 2.0%
|3
| 
|168
|14.1%
|152
|12.2%
|style="background-color:#ffe8e8;"| 15
|-
| style="background-color:"|
| style="text-align:left;" |Green
|110,791
|6.0%
| 1.9%
|0
| 
|19
|1.6%
|35
|2.9%
|style="background-color:#dfd"| 16
|-
| style="background-color:"|
| style="text-align:left;" |Alba
|12,335
|0.7%
|
|0
|
|
|
|
|0.0%
| 
|-
| style="background-color:"|
| style="text-align:left;" |Scottish Family
|6,857
|0.4%
|
|0
|
|
|
|
|0.0%
| 
|-
| style="background-color:"|
| style="text-align:left;" |West Dunbartonshire Community
|1,462
|0.1%
|
|0
|
|
|
|1
|0.1%
|
|-
| style="background-color:"|
| style="text-align:left;" |Scottish Socialist
|1,058
|0.1%
|0.1%
|0
|
|
|
|
|0.0%
|
|-
| style="background-color:"|
| style="text-align:left;" |TUSC
|1,022
|0.1%
|
|0
|
|
|
|
|0.0%
|
|-
| style="background-color:"|
| style="text-align:left;" |British Unionist
|859
|0.1%
|
|0
|
|
|
|1
|0.1%
|style=background-color:#dfd|1
|-
| style="background-color:"|
| style="text-align:left;" |Rubbish
|787
|0.0%
|
|0
|
|
|
|1
|0.1%
|
|-
| style="background-color:"|
| style="text-align:left;" |Independence for Scotland
|742
|0.0%
|
|0
|
|
|
|
|0.0%
| 
|-
| style="background-color:"|
| style="text-align:left;" |Libertarian
|698
|0.0%
|
|0
|
|
|
|
|0.0%
|
|-
| style="background-color:"|
| style="text-align:left;" |Freedom Alliance
|555
|0.0%
|
|0
|
|
|
|
|0.0%
| 
|-
| style="background-color:"|
| style="text-align:left;" |Volt UK
|421
|0.0%
|
|0
|
|
|
|
|0.0%
| 
|-
| style="background-color:"|
| style="text-align:left;" |Socialist Labour
|381
|0.0%
|
|0
|
|
|
|
|0.0%
|
|-
| style="background-color:"|
| style="text-align:left;" |UKIP
|372
|0.0%
|0.2%
|0
|
|
|
|
|0.0%
|
|-
| style="background-color:"|
| style="text-align:left;" |Women's Equality
|228
|0.0%
|
|0
|
|
|
|
|0.0%
| 
|-
| style="background-color:"|
| style="text-align:left;" |Social Democratic
|222
|0.0%
|
|0
|
|
|
|
|0.0%
|
|-
| style="background-color:"|
| style="text-align:left;" |Sovereignty
|154
|0.0%
|
|0
|
|
|
|
|0.0%
| 
|-
| style="background-color:"|
| style="text-align:left;" |Communist
|119
|0.0%
|
|0
|
|
|
|
|0.0%
| 
|-
| style="background-color:"|
| style="text-align:left;" |Pensioner's
|75
|0.0%
|
|0
|
|
|
|
|0.0%
| 
|-
| style="background-color:"|
| style="text-align:left;" |Vanguard
|74
|0.0%
|
|0
|
|
|
|
|0.0%
| 
|-
| style="background-color:"|
| style="text-align:left;" |Workers
|61
|0.0%
|
|0
|
|
|
|
|0.0%
| 
|-
| style="background-color:"|
| style="text-align:left;" |Scottish Eco-Federalist
|24
|0.0%
|
|0
|
|
|
|
|0.0%
| 
|- class=sortbottom style="background-color:#E9E9E9; font-weight:bold;"
! colspan="2" style="text-align:left;" | Total
| 1,889,658
| 100.0
| ±0.0
| 32
| 
| 1,223
| 1,227
| 1,227
| 100.00
| 
|}

Councils 
Parties with coloured cells are part of governing coalitions or are the council administration. The party of the council leader is bold and marked with an asterisk (*).

Previous composition 

This table shows the composition of councils directly prior to the 2022 election. Note that some seats are currently vacant and will not be filled before the election. Included in the Green totals are two councillors who have publicly joined the party since the election (denoted by †), but continue to sit as independents.

Opinion polling

See also
2022 Northern Ireland Assembly election
2022 United Kingdom local elections
2022 Welsh local elections
Politics of Scotland

Notes

References

External links
 Scotland council elections 2022: A really simple guide. BBC News.

2022
 
2022 United Kingdom local elections